Daniel Latkowski (born 11 November 1991) is a German footballer who plays for SV Rödinghausen. He began his career with VfL Osnabrück and made his debut for the club on the opening day of the 2011–12 season, as a substitute for Gerrit Wegkamp in a 1–0 away win over SV Darmstadt 98. He signed for SV Meppen in August 2013.

References

External links

1991 births
Living people
Footballers from Porto
German footballers
VfL Osnabrück players
3. Liga players
Association football midfielders